is a Japanese football player who plays as a midfielder for Campbelltown City.

Playing career
Shogo Yoshikawa played for Zweigen Kanazawa from 2014 to 2015. In 2016, he moved to Vanraure Hachinohe.

In February 2023, Yoshikawa signed for NPS South Australia club Campbelltown City following a three-year spell in Lithuania with FK Banga Gargždai.

Club statistics
.

References

External links

 Profile at Vanraure Hachinohe

1995 births
Living people
People from Kamagaya
Association football people from Chiba Prefecture
Japanese footballers
Association football midfielders
J2 League players
J3 League players
Japan Football League players
A Lyga players
Zweigen Kanazawa players
Vanraure Hachinohe players
FK Banga Gargždai players
Campbelltown City SC players
Japanese expatriate footballers
Expatriate footballers in Lithuania
Japanese expatriate sportspeople in Lithuania
Expatriate soccer players in Australia
Japanese expatriate sportspeople in Australia